Florencio Constantino (April 9, 1869 – November 19, 1919) was a Spanish operatic tenor.

He was born as Florencio Constantineau on April 9, 1869 in Ortuella. He moved to Argentina in 1889. He taught vocal lessons and served as the director at the California Temple of Arts in Los Angeles, one of his students was Ella J. Bradley-Hughley.

In 1917, he was fired by the St. Louis Opera after he sang the premiere performance of Homer Moore's opera Louis XIV and clearly "did not know either the words or music." He was subsequently sued by Moore, who sought $1,200 in damages.

He had a nervous breakdown and died on November 19, 1919 in Mexico City.

References

External links
 Florencio Constantino recordings at the Discography of American Historical Recordings.
 
 

1869 births
1919 deaths
Spanish operatic tenors
Burials at La Recoleta Cemetery
20th-century Spanish male opera singers
People from Greater Bilbao
19th-century Spanish male opera singers
Columbia Records artists
Edison Records artists
Pathé Records artists
Victor Records artists